Geraldine McGinty M.D., MBA, FACR, is an Irish and American physician. She served as Chair of the American College of Radiology Board of Chancellors from 2019-2020. She is the first woman to hold this post. Previously, she served as Chair of the American College of Radiology Commission on Economics.

Early life and education 
Dr. McGinty received her medical degree from the National University of Ireland. She came to the United States for to complete a diagnostic radiology residency at the University of Pittsburgh, where she was Chief Resident. She completed her fellowship in women's imaging at Massachusetts General Hospital.  She completed her MBA at Columbia University while working as an attending physician at Montefiore Medical Center.

Medical career 
Dr. McGinty was employed as an attending radiologist at Westchester County Medical Center from 1994 to 1995. She was then employed as an attending radiologist at Montefiore Medical Center from 1995 to 2002. From 2002 to 2013, Dr. McGinty was one of three managing partners of a 70 physician multi-specialty medical group in Long Island.  After filing for bankruptcy the practice was later acquired by NYU Langone Medical Center.  In 2014, she joined the faculty of Weill Cornell Medicine in New York City where she practices women's imaging and serves as the Chief Strategy Officer and Chief Contracting Officer for the Weill Cornell Physician's Organization. She is also a member of Weill Cornell Medicine's digital health strategy team.

Dr. McGinty was elected to serve as Chair of the American College of Radiology Board of Chancellors in May 2018, and was notably the first woman to hold this position.

References 

Geraldine McGinty: leading light in US radiology.
The Lancet, Volume 395, Issue 10222, P407, February 8, 2020

External links 
 https://weillcornell.org/gbmcginty
 http://drgeraldinemcginty.com/bio-and-headshot/

Living people
Year of birth missing (living people)
Place of birth missing (living people)
Alumni of the National University of Ireland
American radiologists
Women radiologists
Cornell University faculty
Columbia Business School alumni